Pidichirukku is a 2008 Indian Tamil-language romantic drama film, produced by Kool Productions Chida Shenbaga Kumar, directed by Kanagu, starring Ashok Kumar, Vishakha Singh, Sampath Raj, Ganja Karuppu and Saranya Ponvannan. The cinematography is by D. V. Raameswaran and Manu Ramesan scored the music. 'Pidichirukku' was the title which N. Linguswamy was about to use for Run. Director Kanagu, who was working as an assistant director with N. Linguswamy, got the title from him. The film was released during Pongal 2008 to mixed reviews.

Plot 
The protagonists in the love story are Vel (Ashok Kumar), a Hindu coming from a lower-middle-class family and a booking clerk at a lorry transport and cargo agency in Tuticorin and Manju (Vishakha Singh), a Roman Catholic girl, studying in the local college. Their first meeting is an accident caused due to her negligence – when sitting as pillion rider on the back of her father's scooter and trying to go through her examination notes, the paper and her 'duppata' flies off, blinding the bike rider coming behind.

Vel, who was the rider, finds his bike skidding and he ends up with bruises and shouts at Manju and her father Mariadas (Sampath Raj) who was riding the scooter, without realizing that he is the new customs officer at the local port whom he has to interact due to the nature of his work. Manju has a soft corner for him, fearing that due to her mistake he may end up with a head injury.

Later she meets him and sends him a note to take a head scan, which leads to hilarious scenes as his assistant 'Tyre' (Ganja Karuppu) thinks it is a love letter. But as always after the initial spats and quibbles, both Vel and Manju are deeply drawn towards each other. One day while they are romancing on the back of an empty but moving lorry, they are intercepted by Mariadas. All hell breaks loose for the lovers as Manju is brutally beaten up by her dad as her mother Stella (Saranya) tries to protect her. A distraught and drunk Vel on the advice of Tyre and other lorry drivers go to her house in the night asking for her hand, which leads to bedlam.

Three days later, a sobered Vel goes to her house to apologise and finds that they have left town and Mariadas has resigned from customs and just disappeared. How Vel finds her whereabouts and goes to Pune in search of her and undergoes real tough times is what the rest of the film is about.

Cast
 Ashok Kumar as Vel
 Vishakha Singh as Manju
 Sampath Raj as Mariadas
 Ganja Karuppu as Esakki (Tyre)
 Saranya Ponvannan as Stella

Soundtrack
Soundtrack consists of 4 songs which was composed by Manu Ramesan.

Release 
Pavithra Srinivasan of Rediff.com gave the film a rating of three out of five stars and noted that "For Shenbaga Kumar's Tamil film, Pudichirukku, directed by Kanagu with a host of newbies and some recognizable oldies is quite decent as it goes, which is saying quite a lot". A critic from Behindwoods gave the film a rating of two out of five stars and stated that "A love story purely for young lovers dying to see themselves in love stories about separation and longing".

References

2008 films
2000s Tamil-language films
Films shot in Maharashtra
Films set in Maharashtra